Gokana is a Local Government Area in Rivers State, Nigeria. Its headquarter is in the town(community) of Kpor but the traditional headquater is Giokoo.

It has an area of 126 km and a population of 228,828 at the 2006 census. The local language is the Gokana language. Gokana is also divided into two major divisions which are Dee-nwee Gokana also known as pa numuu and Dee-si Gokana also known as  pa bookpo.

The postal code of the area is 504.

Gokana is divided into seventeen towns (Communities), namely: Degen, Deeyor, Yeghe, Biara, Nwebiara, Barako, Nweol, Giokoo, Bera, Lewe, Bomu, Mogho, Kpor, Baranyonwa Dere, Kegbara Dere, Goi and Bodo.  Each  town is headed by a king. The seventeen towns are further subdivided into villages. All seventeen towns have one common ancestry.the native Gokana week is made up of five days namely: Maa, Bon, Zua, SJon, Koo(pronounced cur). Koo is the official sabbath or rest day when our indigenes were to stay at home and not go to the farm. However, it is worthy to note that the days of rest now differs as different communitiea now have their own days. The Gokana people have a rich cultural heritage. The main religions are Christianity and African traditional religions; although most of its customs, traditions and festivals have become extinct due to urbanization and rural-urban migration, some have survived. Amongst these is the "Naa Bira Dae" festival, celebrated around late March to early April in honour of the goddess of the night. It lasts for 15 days or three local weeks and during this period, no woman, child or uninitiated adult male is allowed to go out, except emergency services such as the police. The Gokana language, of the Ogonoid group of the Cross-River branch of the large Niger-Congo language family,[1] is the main spoken language. Weddings, burials(of people who died in old age)and the naming of a child are important ceremonies among the people of Gokana and they are celebrated in style.
Gokana kingdom is headed by a king called the "Gbere Mene" of Gokana Kingdom whose stool is situated at the traditional headquarters of Gokana (Giokoo).

References

Local Government Areas in Rivers State
1991 establishments in Nigeria
1990s establishments in Rivers State